Mário José da Costa Palmeira (born 24 September 1989 in Vila Real) is a Portuguese former professional footballer who played as a central defender.

References

External links

1989 births
Living people
People from Vila Real, Portugal
Portuguese footballers
Association football defenders
Primeira Liga players
Liga Portugal 2 players
Segunda Divisão players
S.C. Braga players
G.D. Ribeirão players
C.F. Estrela da Amadora players
F.C. Vizela players
S.C. Braga B players
C.D. Tondela players
C.F. Os Belenenses players
Real S.C. players
Sportspeople from Vila Real District